Gaston Rivero (February 6, 1978 in Montevideo, Uruguay) is an Uruguayan-US American operatic tenor.

He is a winner of the Hans Gabor Belvedere Singing Competition in Vienna 2009, has appeared in many opera houses, including Théâtre Royal de la Monnaie Bruxelles, Arena di Verona, Teatro Regio Torino, Royal Opera House Muscat, Staatsoper Berlin, Opéra National de Paris Bastille, Opéra de Monte-Carlo, Deutsche Oper Berlin, New National Theatre Tokyo, Oper Leipzig, as well as on Broadway and off Broadway shows.

Early years 
Rivero was born in Montevideo, Uruguay, and raised in Buenos Aires, Argentina. He grew up in the Abasto (a district of the neighbourhood of Balvanera), in which the central fruit and vegetable market was located, where grew up Carlos Gardel the most prominent figure in the history of tango and the Carlos Gardel Museum is now. Rivero worked as an assistant for lawyers while studied at the National Conservatory of Music Carlos Lopez Buchardo in Buenos Aires. Upon his arrival in New York City Gaston Rivero received his education from conductor Eugene Kohn. During this period Gaston Rivero received training from several teachers and coaches from Juilliard School of Music and Manhattan School of Music. In the course of his studies he received grands from the Metropolitan Opera National Council Auditions, the Opera Orchestra of New York, the Opera Foundation, the Sergio Franchi Foundation and the Puccini Foundation among others institutions. During his professional career Mr. Rivero collaborated with renowned musicians such as Ulf Schirmer, Zubin Mehta, Daniel Barenboim, Gianandrea Noseda, Christoph Gedschold, Giacomo Sagripanti, Giuliano Carella, Sesto Quatrini, Fabrizio Maria Carminati, Oleg Caetani, Frederic Chaslin, Friedrich Haider, Massimo Zanetti, Balazs Kocsar and Daniel Oren among several others.

Professional career 
His international stage debut came when film director Baz Luhrmann selected him for his production of Puccini's La Bohème on Broadway in 2002. The same year Gaston Rivero made his solo concert debut at Carnegie Hall in New York City. Since then Mr. Rivero has been known worldwide for his skills and abilities representing the lead Tenor roles from the most demanding Italian Opera repertory in over 1000 performances while guesting worldwide. Made his European debut in 2005 while performing the role of B.F. Pinkerton in Madame Butterfly at the Staatstheater Nürnberg. Worked with Maestro Zubin Mehta and the Israel Philharmonic in Tel Aviv and Jerusalem performing the role of Alfredo in Verdi's La Traviata. Made his debut as Radames in Aida  and Manrico in Il Trovatore  in 2010 at the Stadttheater Klagenfurt. His roles and venues include: Don Jose in Carmen at Deutsche Oper Berlin, Tokyo National Theater and Teatro Massimo Bellini, the title role in Don Carlo at the Staatsoper Berlin, the Opéra National du Rhin  and the Hungarian State Opera Budapest, Ismaele in Nabucco at Teatro Massimo di Palermo and The Opéra de Monte-Carlo, the title role in Verdi's "Otello" and Rodolfo in "Luisa Miller" at Aalto Theater Essen, Des Grieux in Manon Lescaut and Mario Cavaradossi in Tosca at Oper Leipzig, Radames in Aida at Opéra national de Paris Bastille, Théâtre Royal de La Monnaie Bruxelles, Arena di Verona, the National Theater Prague and the Royal Opera House Muscat, Manrico in "Il Trovatore" at Oper Leipzig, Staatsoper Berlin and Grand Théâtre de Bordeaux, Radames in Aida and Calaf in Turandot at Teatro Regio Torino.

Philanthropy and outreach 
Mr. Rivero collaborates with several institutions worldwide visiting schools and hospitals with the purpose of introducing children to Opera, as well as sponsoring concerts for young talents and skilled professionals in renowned venues such as Carnegie Hall, the Schumannhaus in the city of Leipzig, the Konzerthaus in Berlin and the Dresdner Piano Salon Kerstin. Some of his protégés include Steinway & Sons's pianist Sandro Russo and pianist Miriam Gallego Lorente winner of the Lang Lang piano Competition in Berlin. 
In 2021 Gaston Rivero became a member of the voice teachers team of the Lotte Lehmann's Akademie in Perleberg, Brandenburg, Germany. The Academy each year transforms the German city into an international meeting point for Opera.This prestigious position allow Mr. Rivero to join a passionate community of mentors preparing emerging opera singers for professional work while sharing with them essential expertise, experience, support, and motivation for a lasting professional career in Opera.   
Rivero's career has also spanned several media and arts professions: actor, opera singer, producer, composer and music consultant.

Recordings 
Rivero is known for playing the role of Manrico in the Deutsche Grammophon DVD of Il Trovatore alongside Plácido Domingo, Anna Netrebko and Daniel Barenboim. He has worked with many different film-makers such as : Philipp Stölzl, Johannes Schaaf and Baz Luhrmann among others.

Venues 

Deutsche Oper Berlin: Don Jose in Carmen (2009, 2011, 2012, 2013, 2014) – Rodolfo in La Boheme (2011) – Agamegnone in Cassandra (2010) – Cloriviere in Maria Victoire (2011) – Turiddu in Cavalleria rusticana (2018) – Ismaele in Nabucco (2018)

Oper Leipzig: Rodolfo in La Boheme (2012, 2013, 2014, 2015, 2016, 2019, 2020) – Alfredo in La Traviata (2012, 2013, 2014) – Mario Cavaradossi in Tosca (2011, 2013, 2014, 2015, 2016, 2017, 2018, 2019, 2020, 2021, 2022) – Ein Sänger in Der Rosenkavalier (2012, 2014) – Ismaele in Nabucco (2013, 2014, 2015, 2016, 2018) – Des Grieux in Manon Lescaut (2015) – B.F. Pinkerton in Madame Butterfly (2015, 2016, 2017) – Don Carlo in Don Carlo (2017, 2019) – Dick Johnson in La fanciulla del West (2018, 2019, 2020) – Calaf in Turandot (2018) – Don Jose in Carmen (2019, 2020, 2021) – Manrico in Il Trovatore (2020)
 Staatsoper Berlin: Manrico in Il Trovatore (2013) – Don Carlo in Don Carlo (2014) – Macduff in Macbeth (Verdi) (2015) – Gabriele Adorno in Simon Boccanegra (2016)
 Opéra national de Paris Bastille: Radames in Aida (2016)
 Arena di Verona: Radames in Aida (2017)
 Teatro Filarmonico Verona: Des Grieux in Manon Lescaut (2018)
 Teatro Verdi Trieste: Don Jose in Carmen (2019)
 Théâtre Royal de la Monnaie Bruxelles: Radames in Aida (2017)
 Opera Ostfold: Manrico in Il trovatore (2019)
 Savonlinna Opera Festival: B.F. Pinkerton in Madama Butterfly (2018), Radames in Aida (2022)
 The Royal Opera House Muscat, Oman: Radames in Aida (2017)
 Teatro Massimo Bellini Catania: Don Jose in Carmen (2020), Marcello in La Boheme (2022)
 Teatro Verdi di Padova: Calaf in Turandot (2019)
 Teatro Regio Torino: Calaf in Turandot (2018), Radames in Aida (2023)
 Opéra de Toulon: Riccardo in Un Ballo in Maschera (2017)
 Opéra de Monte-Carlo: Ismaele in Nabucco (2016)
 New National Theatre Tokyo: Don Jose in Carmen (2014)
 Staatstheater Stuttgart: Rodolfo in Luisa Miller (2015)
  Teatro Sociale di Rovigo : Manrico in Il Trovatore (2023)
 National Theater Prague: Radames in "Aida" (2020)
 Lithuanian National Opera and Ballet Theatre: Don Carlo in Don Carlo (2022)
 The Slovak National Theatre: Rodolfo in La Boheme (2015)
 Teatro Coccia di Novara : Manrico in "Il Trovatore" (2023)
 Opéra National du Rhin Strasbourg: Don Carlo in Don Carlo (2016)
 The Israeli Opera: Rodolfo in La Boheme (2014) – Romeo in Romeo et Juliette (2016) - Macduff in Macbeth (Verdi) (2016) – Faust in Faust (2017)
 Aalto Musiktheater Essen: Des Grieux in Manon Lescaut (2014) – Rodolfo in Luisa Miller (2015) – Radames in Aida (2016, 2018) – Mario Cavaradossi in Tosca (2016) – Manrico in Il Trovatore (2017, 2018) – Otello in Otello (2019) - Don Carlo in Don Carlo (2022) 
 Hungarian State Opera Budapest: Faust in Mefistofeles (2011, 2012) – Des Grieux in Manon Lescaut (2011) – Verdi: Requiem (2012) – B.F. Pinkerton in Madame Butterfly (2013) – Don Carlo in Don Carlo (2013, 2021) – Dick Johnson in La fanciulla del West (2018, 2019)
 Teatro Mario del Monaco Treviso : Manrico in Il Trovatore (2023)
 Staatstheater Nürnberg: Manrico in Il Trovatore (2012) – B. F. Pinkerton in Madame Butterfly (2005)
 Oper Graz: Des Grieux in Manon Lescaut (2012) – Mario Cavaradossi in Tosca (2014, 2015)
 Nationaltheater Mannheim: B.F. Pinkerton in Madama Butterfly (2017) – Calaf in Turandot (2018)
 The Latvian National Opera: Des Grieux in Manon Lescaut (2015)
 Menuhin Festival Gstaad: Don Jose in Carmen (2014)
 Teatro Pergolesi di Jesi : Manrico in Il Trovatore (2022)
 Staatstheater am Gärtnerplatz: Radames in Aida (2014)
 Lithuanian National Opera: Manrico in Il Trovatore (2015)
 Staatstheater Kassel: Mario Cavaradossi in Tosca (2013)
 Grand Théatre de Genève: Ein Sänger in Der Rosenkavalier (2012, 2014)
 Teatro Solís de Montevideo: Turiddu in Cavalleria Rusticana (2011) – Macduff in Macbeth (2013)
 The Israel Philharmonic Orchestra: Alfredo in La Traviata (2014)
 Grand Théatre/Opéra National de Bordeaux: Manrico in Il Trovatore (2011)
 Staatstheater Mainz: Faust in Mefistofele (2013)
 Staatstheater Hannover: Don Jose in Carmen (2013)
 Stadttheater Klagenfurt: Radames in Aida (2010) – Manrico in Il Trovatore (2010) – Verdi: Requiem (2010) – Mario Cavaradossi in Tosca (2011)
 Croatian National Theatre Zagreb: Manrico in Il Trovatore (2011)
 Palm Beach Opera: Alfredo in La Traviata (2008)
 Theater Freiburg: Des Grieux in Manon Lescaut (2011)
 Staatstheater Darmstadt: Rodolfo in La Boheme (2010)
 Opera Carolina: Romeo in Romeo et Juliette (2007)
 PortOpera: Romeo in Romeo et Juliette (2007)
 Opéra de Lausanne: Don Jose in Carmen (Japan Tour 2008)
 Teatr Wielki Opera Narodowa: Don Carlo in Don Carlo (2013)
 Teatro Massimo di Palermo: Ismaele in Nabucco (2013)
 Wichita Grand Opera: Alfredo in La Traviata (2006) – Don Carlo in Don Carlo (2015)
 El Paso Opera: Alfredo in La Traviata (2006)
 Lyric Opera of San Antonio: Alfredo in La Traviata (2006)
 Opera Orchestra of New York: Primo cantatore in La Gioconda (2004) – Trin in La Fanciulla del West (2004) – Hadji in Lakme (2004) – Flaminio in L'amore dei Tre Re (2007)
 Auditorio Zaragoza: Alfredo in La Traviata (2008) – Don Jose in Carmen (2007) – Manrico in Il Trovatore (2009) – Rodolfo in La Bohème (2010)
 Knoxville Opera: Don Jose in Carmen (2006)
 Deutsche Oper Berlin: Normano in Lucia di Lammermoor (2008) – Messagero in Aida (2008) – Parpignol in La Bohème (2008) – Giuseppe in La Traviata (2008)
 Westfield Symphony Orchestra: B.F. Pinkerton in Madame Butterfly (2007)
 Festival de Sédières: Mario Cavaradossi in Tosca (2009)
 Warsaw Philharmonic – Don Jose – Carmen (2016)
 Sugi Opera Seoul Arts Center – Don Jose – Carmen (2016)

Awards 
 2nd place International Hans Gabor Belvedere Singing Competition, Vienna 2009
 Scholarship Prize from The Opera Foundation 2008
 1st place Gerda Lissner Foundation 2008
 Finalist Francisco Viñas, Barcelona 2008
 Finalist Concours International d'Opéra de Marseille 2008
 Vidda Award from The Opera Orchestra of New York 2007
 Mrs. Edgar Tobin Award der Tobin Endowment 2007
 2nd Place Winner – Concurso de Canto Montserrat Caballé 2007
 Winner George London Foundation Competition, NYC 2007
 1st place Metropolitan Opera National Audition Eastern Region 2006 & 2007
 1st place singing competition of the Giulio Gari Foundation 2006
 1st place/scholarship Fritz and Lavinia Jensen Foundation 2006
 NJ Alliance for the performing Arts 2006
 Finalist Operalia Valencia 2006
 Special Award Licia Albanese Puccini Foundation 2004 & 2006
 Finalist BBC Cardiff Singer of the World 2005
 1st place Joyce Dutka Arts Foundation 2004
 2nd place Altamura/Caruso International Voice Competition NYC 2004
 Winner – Palm Beach Opera Competition, Palm Beach Florida 2004
 Winner Opera Index Vocal Competition, NYC 2003 & 2005
 Winner Dicapo Opera Competition 2003
 Winner Ibla Bellini Competition 2003
 1st prize Classical Productions Competition Carnegie Hall 2002

References

External links 

 operabase
 Gaston Rivero´s official website
 
 World Tenors Unleashed – Concert, NYC, August 2015

1978 births
Living people
Operatic tenors
Singers from Montevideo
Uruguayan opera singers